German submarine U-24 was a Type IIB U-boat that was in service of Nazi Germany's Kriegsmarine during World War II. She was laid down on 21 April 1936 at the F. Krupp Germaniawerft in Kiel with yard number 554, launched on 24 September and commissioned into the Kriegsmarine on 10 October. Oberleutnant zur See Heinz Buchholz took command on 3 July 1937.

Design
German Type IIB submarines were enlarged versions of the original Type IIs. U-24 had a displacement of  when at the surface and  while submerged. She had two shafts and two  propellers.

U-24 was fitted with three  torpedo tubes at the bow, five torpedoes or up to twelve Type A torpedo mines, and a  anti-aircraft gun. The boat had a complement of twenty-five.

Fate
To serve in the 30th U-boat Flotilla, she was transported in sections along the Danube to the Romanian port of Galați. She was then re-assembled at the Galați shipyard and sent to the Black Sea. On 25 August 1944, U-24 was scuttled at Constanţa, on the Romanian Black Sea coast to prevent the advancing Soviet forces from capturing it.

Summary of raiding history

References

Notes

Citations

Bibliography

External links

German Type II submarines
U-boats commissioned in 1936
U-boats scuttled in 1944
World War II submarines of Germany
World War II shipwrecks in the Black Sea
Germany–Soviet Union relations
Ships sunk as targets
1936 ships
Ships built in Kiel
Ships built in Romania
Maritime incidents in August 1944